Kenneth Vincent Taylor (born 18 June 1936) is an English footballer, who played as a full back in the Football League for Manchester City.

References

Manchester City F.C. players
Association football fullbacks
English Football League players
Buxton F.C. players
1936 births
Living people
Footballers from Manchester
English footballers